Larry Thompson, Lawrence Thompson or Laurence Thompson may refer to:

Larry R. Thompson, president of the Ringling College of Art plus Design in Sarasota, Florida
Larry Thompson (born 1945), American lawyer and deputy Attorney General of the United States under George W. Bush 
Laurence Thompson (1920–2005), USC professor of East Asian languages
Lawrence S. Thompson (1916–1986), University of Kentucky Director of Libraries
Larry A. Thompson (born 1944), American film producer
Larry Thompson (humorist) (died 1973), humorist with the Miami Herald
Larry Thompson (gridiron football), gridiron football wide receiver

See also
Laurence Tomson (1539–1608), editor